The 1934 Giro di Lombardia was the 30th edition of the race. It was held on October 21, 1934, competing over a total route of 245 km. It was won by the Italian Learco Guerra, reached the finish line with the time of 7h34 ' 00 "at an average of 32.378 km/h, preceding the countrymen Mario Cipriani and Domenico Piemontesi.

160 cyclists took off from Milan and 60 of them completed the race.

General classification

References

External links
 Web oficial de la carrera ((in Italian))
 El Sitio de Ciclismo
 
 Resultados a Les-Sports.info

1934 in road cycling
Giro di Lombardia
1934 in Italian sport